Graham Woodrup was a competitive cyclist from Port Fairy who set many long-distance records including Perth to Sydney and the 24-hour tandem world record. He and his wife, Hester established the Murray to Moyne Cycle Relay in 1987 which is an annual charity ride. His life was cut short when hit by a car during a training ride.

References

Australian male cyclists
1992 deaths
Male touring cyclists
Place of birth missing
1946 births
Ultra-distance cyclists